Lokesh Dixit is an Indian politician and a member of the 16th Legislative Assembly of Uttar Pradesh of India. He represents the Baraut constituency of Uttar Pradesh and is a member of the Bahujan Samaj Party political party.

Early life and education
Lokesh Dixit was born in Village Gyasri urf Gaadhi, Baghpat district, Uttar Pradesh. He attended the National Institute of Open Schooling and is educated till tenth grade degree.

Political career
Lokesh Dixit has been a MLA for one term. He represented the Baraut constituency and is a member of the Bahujan Samaj Party political party.

Posts held

See also
Baraut
Sixteenth Legislative Assembly of Uttar Pradesh
Uttar Pradesh Legislative Assembly

References 

Bahujan Samaj Party politicians from Uttar Pradesh
Uttar Pradesh MLAs 2012–2017
People from Baraut
1965 births
Living people